Vadugankuthagai is a revenue village under Alathur, Thanjavur panchayat in the Pattukkottai taluk of Thanjavur district, Tamil Nadu, India.

Demographics 

As per the 2001 census, Vadugankuthagai had a total population of 668 with 347 males and 321 females. The sex ratio was 925. The literacy rate was 65.61.

References 

 

Villages in Thanjavur district